In the context of slavery in the United States, the personal liberty laws were laws passed by several U.S. states in the North to counter the Fugitive Slave Acts of 1793 and 1850.  Different laws did this in different ways, including allowing jury trials for escaped slaves and forbidding state authorities from cooperating in their capture and return.  States with personal liberty laws included Connecticut, Massachusetts, Michigan, Maine, New Hampshire, Ohio, Pennsylvania, Wisconsin, and Vermont.

Overview

The personal liberty laws were a series of legislative acts that were implemented in the United States between the 1800s and the beginning of the civil war. These laws were a direct response to the Fugitive Slave Acts of 1793 and of 1850.  The Personal Liberty Laws were designed to make the legal system more fair for all people and to ensure the safety of freedmen and escaped slaves without employing the controversial tactic of nullification.  The reasoning behind this decision was simply to avoid more feuding between the northern and southern states.  Only two states, New Jersey, and California, gave direct official sanction or assistance to the forced return of fugitive slaves, but Indiana, Illinois and Oregon, did so indirectly, by prohibiting the entrance within their borders of black people either slave or free. However, the United States would still endure a tense and strained relationship between the Northern and Southern states in the years leading up to the civil war.  

The Fugitive Slave Act of 1793 did not provide for trial by jury. Indiana (1824) and Connecticut (1828) enacted laws making jury trials for escaped slaves possible upon appeal. In 1840 Vermont and New York granted fugitives the right of jury trial and provided them with attorneys. After 1842, when the U.S. Supreme Court ruled that enforcement of the Fugitive Slave Act was a federal function, some Northern state governments passed laws forbidding state authorities to cooperate in the capture and return of fugitives. In the reaction to the Fugitive Slave Act contained in the Compromise of 1850, most Northern states provided further guarantees of jury trial, authorized severe punishment for illegal seizure and perjury against alleged fugitives, and forbade state authorities to recognize claims to fugitives. These laws were cited as a justification for secession by Georgia, Mississippi, South Carolina, and Texas in 1860–1.

Causes
The Fugitive Slave Laws of 1793 were grossly unfair to the accused.  The intended purpose of the laws was to give slave owners the legal protection when dealing with the problem of escaped slaves.  In reality, the Fugitive Slave Laws actually expanded the slave trade.  These laws provided the opportunity for slave owners to go into northern states and reclaim previously freed slaves.  The laws gave any slave owner the ability to seize an alleged escaped slave, present the slave to a federal or local judge, and, upon proof of ownership, have the slave legally  returned to their service.  However, the only proof that was required was the testimony of a witness.  This meant that many freedmen were taken back into slavery because of rigged courts and injustice.  Another reason that the Fugitive Slave Laws created the need to be counteracted by the Personal Liberty Laws, was the threat to those who tried to help a fugitive.  The Fugitive Slave Laws placed a five hundred dollar fine  on anyone who helped an escaped slave or obstructed a slave owner's attempt to retake a slave.  This made it extremely daunting for those who wanted to end slavery by assisting those slaves seeking their freedom.  The Personal Liberty Laws sought also to protect the rights of those who didn't want to turn in escaped slaves.
In 1850, amendments were made to the Fugitive Slave Laws, which made them even more onerous.  These amendments decreed that the alleged fugitive was not allowed to testify at the hearing and federal marshals were financially liable if they did not execute the warrants or if they allowed fugitives to escape.  The 1850 amendments also provided Commissioners with twice as much compensation, ten dollars verses five dollars, for granting certificates of ownership as for denying them.  Furthermore, penalties were increased for obstructing slave owners or helping fugitives, and included imprisonment.  These laws were blatantly unfair, intrusive, and prompted some northern states to introduce the Personal Liberty Laws preemptively to offset the infringements to personal liberties the Fugitive Slave Laws allowed.

Prigg v Pennsylvania

The case between Edward Prigg and Margret Morgan demonstrated one of the complications that arose out of the fugitive slave laws. The case began when Margret Morgan, a slave to John Ashmore, was granted her freedom.  This was not a formal change, merely a promise that she could do as she pleased. After her former owner's death, Ashmore's heirs hired Edward Prigg, a slave catcher, to go to Pennsylvania and bring Margret Morgan, and her children, back with him to Maryland. It was his plan to reinstate them as slaves. The Personal Liberty Law of 1826 decreed that no person could be taken out of the state of Pennsylvania to be held as a slave. Prigg was arrested and tried upon his return to the state with Margret and her family. Prigg argued in front of the Supreme Court that the Personal Liberty Laws were unconstitutional.  He argued that the crime that he was being charged for was a perfectly legal act under the constitution. In the end, the Court ruled that the federal Fugitive Slave Act preempted Pennsylvania's Personal Liberty Law under the Supremacy Clause, and Prigg's conviction was overturned.
The Personal Liberty Laws  were constitutionally dubious.  In this example, Prigg claimed that he was acting under article IV section II of the constitution, which clearly states that criminals or fugitives cannot escape punishment or recapture by leaving their state for another.  The Personal Liberty Law that had passed in 1826 directly stated that anyone, including escaped slaves, could not be brought into Pennsylvania and kept as a slave.  This contradiction made the Personal Liberty Laws controversial.

Threats
Prigg was not the only one to openly attack the Personal Liberty Laws.  Many of these laws were ignored by officials of the law and judges.  This unequal treatment however did not stop the abolitionists from their fight to win justice for all people.  Because most of the abolitionists and supporters of the Personal Liberty Laws resided in the northern states, the controversy  added to the already growing rift  between the two halves of the country.  The northern states refused to repeal the laws and the southern states were not willing to give up slavery.  The end result was the bloodiest war of American history; the Civil War.  
At the end of this bloody chapter, it was not the Personal Liberty Laws that were changed but the constitution itself.

External links
 An Act for the Defense of Liberty in this State (Connecticut, 1854)
 An Act to Protect the Rights and Liberties of the People of the Commonwealth of Massachusetts (Massachusetts, 1855)
 An Act to protect the rights and liberties of the inhabitants of this State (Michigan, 1855)
 An Act further to protect personal liberty (Maine, 1855)
 An Act to secure freedom and the rights of citizenship to persons in this State (New Hampshire, 1857)
 An Act to prevent kidnapping (Ohio, 1857)
 An Act to prevent Slaveholding and Kidnapping in Ohio (Ohio, 1857)
 Of the Writ of Habeas Corpus Relative to Fugitive Slaves (Wisconsin, 1857)
 An Act to secure freedom to all persons within this State (Vermont, 1858)

References

Further reading
 
United States slavery law
Legal history of the United States